The Honda Concerto is a car produced from 1988 to 1996. It was jointly developed by Honda and the Austin Rover Group and was introduced in Japan on 15 June 1988, and in European markets in October 1989. Japanese production finished in October 1992 and British production finished in 1995 (although a rebadged Rover diesel with Honda Concerto badging continued to be built until late 1996). The car was named for the musical composition and was a successor to the second generation Honda Ballade, a higher specification Honda Civic. All Japanese versions were exclusive to Japanese Honda dealerships called Honda Clio.

Production and delivery
The Concerto was sold in both liftback and sedan styles and built in two locations: Austin Rover's Longbridge plant for the European market, and by Honda in Suzuka, Mie, Japan. Honda intended for the car to appeal to European tastes.

Japanese production began in June 1988, originally only as a front-wheel drive sedan. The liftback and four-wheel drive sedan became available one month later, in July 1988. European deliveries, meanwhile, only began after British Concerto production commenced at the end of 1989. The Europe-only models, such as the 1.4, were released in October 1989. In Australia and some European countries, for example Germany and Switzerland, it was only sold as a five-door liftback so as to not compete internally with the four-door Civic Sedan. In many European markets it acted as replacement for the slow-selling Honda Integra five-door liftback. The sedan version was produced until 1993 for most nations, especially in the United Kingdom, where sales were lower compared to the more upscale Rover 200 and Rover 400 Series.

Specifications
The Japanese-built models, MA1 (1.5-liter), MA2 (1.6-liter) and MA3 (1.6-liter 4WD) were produced with double wishbone suspension whilst the British-built model, HW, were produced with MacPherson struts.

Engine choices were:
1.8 Liter turbodiesel with  DIN at 4,300 rpm (Peugeot-supplied engine in badge-engineered Rover 200)

The four-door sedan was offered with four-wheel drive in Japan, a system later shared with the Civic-based compact SUV, the Honda CR-V. The Japanese range received a facelift in February 1991, when the twin-cam ZC engine was also added to the JZ-Si model. The facelift included new taillights and a more upright front design, with more bulbous headlights.

The Concerto was based on a platform which was shared with the popular Civic. Just like the five-door Integra it replaced, it offered more features than the Civic and was aimed at a more prestigious section of the market. The styling of the Concerto reflected an influence from the Honda Ascot, most notably the six-light window treatment of the greenhouse.

Concerto TD
For France, Italy, and Portugal only, markets where diesel engines were essential offerings, a turbodiesel Concerto was made available late in the model's life. In France, for instance, Rover's 200/400 series outsold the Concerto by a ratio of five-to-one, with diesels representing 80 percent of Rover sales. This model was Honda's first diesel-engined passenger car (aside from the 1993 Honda Jazz, a rebadged Isuzu only available in Japan).

The Concerto TD, however, was a badge-engineered Rover 218 SLD Turbo and thus has completely different sheetmetal from Honda's own Concertos. Introduced in August 1994, it was only available as a five-door liftback. In addition to the different appearance and interior (including the Rover's wood trim), the TD has Rover's MacPherson strut front suspension rather than Honda's typical double wishbone setup as used on petrol-engined Concertos. The only difference was emblems and hubcaps. As with the Rover 218 SLD, the Concerto TD was fitted with Peugeot's 1.8-liter XUD7 engine. While arriving very late, several years after the range had been replaced in Japan, its mission appears to have succeeded: the TD version represented 94 percent of French Concerto sales in 1995. Production ended in October 1996.

Replacement
Honda stopped manufacturing the Concerto in Great Britain about a year after its partner, Rover, was taken over by BMW in 1994. Petrol-engined models were built there until 1995, while the Rover-based diesel lasted until October 1996. It was replaced by a new, Swindon-built five-door Honda Civic liftback, itself a rebadged version of the Honda Domani which had replaced the Concerto in Japan in 1992. The Civic liftback was quite different from the rest of the sixth generation Civic range as it, and the Domani, were based on the fifth generation (EG, EH) Civic's platform instead.

Gallery

References 

Concerto
Cars introduced in 1988
1980s cars
1990s cars
Cars discontinued in 1994